Shooting competitions at the 2019 European Games in Minsk were held between 22 and 28 June 2019.

A total of 19 events were contested. The winner in each of the 12 individual events contained a quota place for the 2020 Summer Olympics.

Qualification
The 24 best ranked athletes in the individual events at the European Ranking Lists as of 31 December 2018 will qualify one quota place for their NOCs, respecting the maximum quota places allocation per NOC per event. The participants in mixed team events will be athletes qualified to take part in individual events.

Medal summary

Men's events

Women's events

Mixed team events

Medal table

References

External links
Results book

 
Sports at the 2019 European Games
European Games
2019